Via Veneto is a Michelin starred restaurant in Barcelona, Catalonia, Spain.

References

Michelin Guide starred restaurants in Spain
Restaurants in Barcelona